Mwerlap is an Oceanic language spoken in the south of the Banks Islands in Vanuatu.

Its 1,100 speakers live mostly in Merelava and Merig, but a fair proportion have also settled the east coast of Gaua island. Besides, a number of Mwerlap speakers live in the two cities of Vanuatu, Port Vila and Luganville.

Name
The language is named after Mwerlap, the native name of Merelava island.

Phonology
Mwerlap has 12 phonemic vowels. These include 9 monophthongs  and 3 diphthongs .

Grammar
The system of personal pronouns in Mwerlap contrasts clusivity, and distinguishes three numbers (singular, dual, plural).

Spatial reference in Mwerlap is based on a system of geocentric (absolute) directionals, which is in part typical of Oceanic languages, and yet innovative.

References

Bibliography

 .

External links
Linguistic map of north Vanuatu, showing range of Mwerlap.
Online material in Mwerlap (Merlav): audio recordings, documents, etc.
Na Buk Tatar, Portions of the Book of Common Prayer in the Merelava (Mwerlap) language, digitized by Richard Mammana
Audio recordings in the Mwerlap language, in open access, by A. François (source: Pangloss Collection, CNRS).
Materials on Mwerlap are included in the open access Arthur Capell collections (AC1 and AC2) held by Paradisec.

Languages of Vanuatu
Banks–Torres languages
Torba Province